Leo Kouwenhoven (born ) is a Dutch physicist known for his research on quantum computing.

Kouwenhoven grew up in Pijnacker, a village near Delft, where his parents ran a farm. After losing the admission lottery for veterinary medicine he decided to study physics at Delft University of Technology (TU Delft).

In 1999 he became a professor at TU Delft. In 2007 he received the Spinoza Prize, the highest Dutch academic award. In April 2012 his TU Delft research group presented experimental results that provided potential "signatures" of Majorana fermion quasiparticles. These Majorana quasiparticles would be very stable, and therefore suitable for building a quantum computer.

In 2018 his research group claimed to have proved the definitive existence of Majorana particles in a Nature publication. However, the results could not be reproduced by other scientists, and the article had to be retracted in 2021 due to "insufficient scientific rigour".
 The researchers had excluded data points that contradicted their claims, with the complete data not supporting their conclusions.

Personal life 
Kouwenhoven has six sisters and is married to Vrije Universiteit Amsterdam professor Marleen Huysman.

References 

Living people
1963 births
20th-century Dutch physicists
Members of the Royal Netherlands Academy of Arts and Sciences
Spinoza Prize winners
21st-century Dutch physicists
Delft University of Technology alumni
People from Pijnacker-Nootdorp
Academic staff of the Delft University of Technology